Jones Soda Co. is a beverage company based in Seattle, Washington, United States. It bottles and distributes soft drinks, non-carbonated beverages, energy drinks, and candy.

History

The 1990s

The company was founded by Peter Van Stolk in 1995 
 as a beverage distributor in Western Canada.

The 2000s
The company entered the alternative beverages market as the 'Urban Juice & Soda Company'''. By 2000, over 85% of its revenues came from the Jones Soda brand, and the company officially changed its name to Jones Soda and moved its headquarters from  Vancouver to Seattle. In November 2006, Jones Soda announced that it would replace high fructose corn syrup (HFCS) in its products with cane sugar (in the form of an inverted syrup). On January 22, 2007, Jones Pure Cane Soda was launched in 12-ounce cans. By April 2007, all of the company's products switched to cane sugar, except for its energy drinks, which changed that fall.

In 2007, the company announced an $11.6 million loss, due to the attempted expansion into the canned-soda market, whose barriers to entry were high against mass-produced Coca-Cola and Pepsi.

In 2008, Jones Soda announced a second-quarter loss and the downsizing of 42 employees (40% of its workforce), cutting costs a little over $2.6 million annually.

The 2010s

In March 2010, Jones Soda agreed to allow rival, Reed's, Inc., to purchase the company at a steep discount. Later in the month, Jones backed out of the purchase. The company then named former Talking Rain president William Meissner as President and CEO.

In June 2010, the company announced a distribution deal with Walmart and $10 million in financing from Glengrove Small Cap Value Ltd.

In June 2011, Jones moved out of its South Lake Union headquartersAllison, Melissa. "Jones Soda eyes mainstream soda market." The Seattle Times. Thursday May 15, 2008. Retrieved February 12, 2010. "...Jones said last week at the company's South Lake Union headquarters." to a building in Pioneer Square opposite CenturyLink Field.

In 2012, Jennifer Cue was hired as CEO.

In Spring 2015, Jones moved out of its Pioneer Square building to a larger space in Seattle.

The 2020s

In December 2020, Mark Murray was promoted to CEO.

Beverage line

Jones Soda was developed in 1995 and introduced in 1996 with six flavors: Orange, Cherry, Lemon-Lime, Strawberry-Lime, Raspberry, and Grape in 12 oz. glass bottles.

On March 17, 2004, a deal was announced to distribute Jones Soda in over 3900 Starbucks locations in the United States, though Starbucks stopped distributing Jones Soda in the United States as of 2007. On October 12, 2004, Jones Soda introduced 12oz cans for the first time with an exclusive distribution deal with Target, though other stores (including some Kmart, Food Pyramid, and Albertsons locations) now also sell the cans. Jones Soda was also sold at Ruby Tuesday restaurant.

Since the introduction of the original flavors, Jones has created many additional flavors.

Slim and Sugar-Free
In January 1999, Jones introduced the "slim" line of diet sodas but discontinued it in 2003 in favor of a sugar-free line.  Its sugar-free formulas contain sucralose of the Splenda brand  and acesulfame potassium, but no aspartame.

Four flavors were considered "Mid-Calorie", including Twisted Lime, Watermelon, Tangerine, and Blueberry. These flavors were sweetened with Splenda, but still included 21 grams of sugar (compared to approximately 45–50 grams in the regular sodas).

In 2019, Jones introduced two new sugar-free flavors: SF Strawberry Lime, and SF Cream Soda. These flavors join sugar-free Cola on the current zero-sugar menu.

WhoopAss and Jones Energy
In October 1999, Jones introduced Jones Soda WhoopAss.

Jones Energy was the second entry into the energy drink market and included three flavors in 8.4 oz. cans: Mixed Berry, Lemon Lime, and Orange. Big Jones Energy and Sugar-Free Jones Energy (both 16oz cans) were also available. Jones Energy was discontinued in late 2008.

Jones Juice and Naturals
Jones Juice debuted in 2001 with such flavors as Limes with Orange, Berry White, Dave, Black, Purple Carrot, and Fu Cran Fu. "Dave" was a tea named for Dave Dafoe, founder of Flavorman, the company which developed all of the Jones brand's original flavors. The line was renamed Jones Naturals in 2002 and later expanded to include Betty, Bananaberry, D'Peach Mode, Bada Bing!, Bohemian Raspberry, and Strawberry Manilow.

Jones Organics
In 2005, Jones announced a new line in its series: Jones Organics. The blends consist of six different tea-based flavors—two each of white tea, green tea, and red tea.

24C
Jones came out with 24C sports drinks in 2006, first available in two flavors.

GABA
In April 2009, Jones released a new line of beverages named GABA, after its featured ingredient, gamma-aminobutyric acid. The GABA line is now listed on their retired products list.

Jones Zilch
Released in the fourth quarter of 2009, Zilch is a sugar-free, aspartame-free soft drink sweetened with Splenda. Its flavors are pomegranate, cream soda, vanilla bean, black cherry, and cola.

Nuka Cola
From 2009-10, Jones Soda produced a limited edition Nuka-Cola in collaboration with Target stores and Fallout series developer Bethesda Softworks. Jones' Nuka-Cola was re-released from 2014-16 and 2020-22 to capitalise on the release of Fallout 4 and Fallout 76. Flavours included the original Nuka-Cola, Nuka-Cherry, Nuka-Victory and blue Nuka-Cola Quantum.

7-Select
In 2016, Jones Soda partnered with 7-Eleven to produce a line of five flavors available exclusively at the convenience store chain.

 Jones Cane Sugar Fountain 
2015 saw the addition of BiB (bag-in-box) product and custom photo-collage fountain equipment. Flavors available on the fountain range from traditional selections like Cane Sugar Cola and Root Beer to the company’s specialty flavors like Berry Lemonade and Green Apple.

 Mary Jones 
In 2022, Jones announced a cannabis-infused soda and candy brand, Mary Jones. The brand was to be rolled out in California as a test market starting April 1, and in other legalized states later.

Non-beverage products

Flavored lip balm
In October 2004, Jones announced a licensing agreement with Lime Lite Marketing to create Jones flavored lip balm. The line features UV-A and UV-B protection, SPF 15, Aloe Vera, and Vitamin E. Available flavors include Green Apple, Fufu Berry, Orange & Cream, Strawberry Lime, Cream Soda, Bacon, and Blue Bubble Gum.

Frozen soda pops
In early 2005, Jones Soda entered the "frozen novelty" market with their Jones Frozen Soda Pops. They were available in Green Apple, Berry Lemonade, and Cherry soda flavors. The Jones Frozen Soda Pops were part of a three-year licensing agreement with Kroger, and are not currently available.

Carbonated candy
On October 19, 2005, a press statement was released in regards to Jones Soda's licensing agreement with Big Sky Brands to produce a soda "flavor booster" candy. At the time, they announced that the candy's three different flavors of "Jones Soda Carbonated Candy" would be Berry Lemonade, Fufu Berry, and Green Apple. The product was released in the United States in 2006. In 2007, the lineup was increased to six flavors, the three new flavors being Orange & Cream, Cream Soda, and M.F. Grape.

Jones expanded its carbonated candy line further in 2006 to include "Jones Soda Energy Boosters", which contain Niacin, Vitamin B12, Taurine, and Vitamin B6. Marketing literature says, "1 tin of Jones Boosters = 3 Jones Energy Drinks".

In 2007, Big Sky Brands announced a contest to incorporate 24 user-submitted photos of crazy, distorted sour face "cringes" onto a new labeling of "Jones Soda Carbonated Sours". They entered the market in 2008, initially in three flavors: Electric Lemonade, Limes with Orange, and Spiked Punch.

Limited editions

2003
The first special edition of Jones was the Jones Hot Wheels Pack, created in July 2003 to honor the 35th anniversary of Hot Wheels. The pack included a Hot Wheels Jones Soda Orange RV along with four themed bottles and was only available through the Jones Soda website.

In November 2003, Jones introduced a "Turkey & Gravy" seasonal flavor in honor of Thanksgiving. Demand was so overwhelming that Jones sold out within two hours, the bottles (both full and empty) fetching in excess of $10 a piece on auction sites such as eBay.

2004
In 2004, it offered a complete, drinkable Thanksgiving dinner—five bottles—as a box set for $16. Turkey & Gravy was brought back, and the rest of the flavors were unique to this offering: Green Bean Casserole, Cranberry, Mashed Potatoes with Butter, and Fruitcake. The limited-edition pack sold out in under an hour, temporarily crashing the company's email and Internet servers. As in 2003, people resold some seasonal bottles on auction sites such as eBay, with bids reaching as high as $100 a pack. Jones Soda's profits in both years were donated to the charity Toys for Tots.

2005
In 2005, Jones released Halloween Limited Edition 8 oz. can 4-packs, exclusively through Target. The four flavors included two originals (Candy Corn and Caramel Apple), as well as two renamed flavors (Strawberry Slime and Scary Berry Lemonade).

Flavors released at the end of October 2005 in many Target stores (and, eventually, via the Jones Soda website) included, as in 2004, five different varieties. "Turkey & Gravy" and "Cranberry" made a return from 2004, with three new additions: Wild Herb Stuffing, Pumpkin Pie, and Brussels sprout. A list of wines, half-humorously included on a label on the front of the box, offered suggestions that would "match" with said flavors.

A second limited edition collection was also created in 2005, in part to celebrate the Seattle regional aspect of the company. This collection was also made available in other places across the United States, including select Speedway, Kroger, and Cost Plus World Market stores. The flavors differed from the first 2005 limited edition and included in addition to Turkey & Gravy; Smoked Salmon Pâté, Corn on the Cob, Broccoli Casserole, and for dessert, Pecan Pie. As in years past, all profits from the Holiday Pack collections went to charities, in this case St. Jude's Research Hospital and Toys for Tots.

2006
In February 2006, Jones introduced the first Valentines Pack. Each pack contained two bottles of "Love Potion #6" soda, a Love Potion No. 6 flavored lip balm, a three-track sampler CD, a book of "Love Coupons", and a coupon for two free bottles of customized myJones. In addition to selling the packs through retailers and their website, Jones partnered with the non-profit organization, Operation AC, to donate 10,000 packs to U.S. troops stationed in Afghanistan and Iraq.

In September 2006, Jones released the 10th Anniversary Pack, which included two "current favorites" (Green Apple and Blue Bubblegum), and two "original favorites" (Pineapple Upside Down and Raspberry), along with a Hot Wheels version of a Jones Van. The bottles were printed with special foil detailing and each pack was numbered with only 10,500 ever made, available only by ordering through their website.

The Halloween cans were available again in 2006 with the return of Candy Corn and Berried Alive (formerly Scary Berry Lemonade) and the new Spider Cider and Gruesome Grape (a renamed version of their regular flavor, MF Grape). Along with the cans, Limited Edition bottles were available in three flavors: Monster Mojito, Lemon Drop Dead, and Creepy Cranberry. Unlike previous Limited Edition bottles, these were available in the normal 4-pack carriers rather than special packages. Also in October 2006, Jones released the Berries and Cream Limited Edition pack to raise awareness for the Breast Cancer Recovery Foundation.

The 2006 Holiday Pack introduced some new flavors in addition to the now-classic Turkey & Gravy, including Sweet Potato, Dinner Roll, Pea, and Antacid (which included a disclaimer stating it had no medicinal qualities). The second 2006 pack was dubbed the Dessert Pack and included Cherry Pie, Banana Cream Pie, Key Lime Pie, Apple Pie, and Blueberry Pie. Proceeds once again went to St. Jude's and Toys for Tots. Three additional flavors (Egg Nog, Sugar Plum, and Candy Cane) were also created in 4-packs similar to the special Halloween bottles.

2007
In 2007 Jones Soda again sold the Valentines Pack, including the two bottles of Love Potion No. 6, a pair of Jones-branded boxer shorts, a box of Necco Conversation hearts, and a "Spin the Bottle" board printed on the back of the box.

In preparation for the Seattle Seahawks' 2007 season, Jones offered a limited-edition Seahawks pack starting on September 27.  The collectors' pack included sodas flavored in Perspiration, Sports Cream, Natural Field Turf, Dirt, and Sweet Victory. In the Pacific Northwest, Jones labeled their regular sodas with Seahawks-themed pictures during the 2007 football season.

The Halloween edition mini-cans returned in October, featuring the new flavor Sour Lemon Drop Dead, along with returning flavors Candy Corn, Strawberry Slime, and Gruesome Grape. Three Target-exclusive flavors were also released: new flavors Black Cat Licorice (Black Licorice) and Dread Licorice (Red Licorice), along with returning flavor Monster Mojito.

Around Thanksgiving, Jones again released three flavors for the Holidays, exclusively at Target stores. Christmas Cocoa, Candy Cane, and Gingerbread each came in a 4-bottle carry pack. Additionally, the Dessert Pack was re-released with new flavor Lemon Meringue Pie, plus returning flavors Apple Pie, Cherry Pie, and Blueberry Pie.

In place of their annual Thanksgiving pack, Jones released two new holiday-themed sets.  The 2007 Jones Holiday Packs offered choices for both Christmas and Chanukah. The 2007 Christmas Pack included new flavors Christmas Ham and Christmas Tree, along with returning flavors Egg Nog and Sugar Plum, with proceeds benefiting Toys for Tots.  The 2007 Happy Hanukkah Pack was a four-bottle set of Latke, Applesauce, Chocolate Coins, and Jelly Doughnut sodas, and included "1 completely functional dreidel;" proceeds from Chanukah Pack sales benefited Vitamin Angels. Both holiday packs contained no caffeine. All sodas, including the ham-flavored soda, were certified kosher.

2008
For the first time, Jones released three new flavors in celebration of Easter: Robin's Egg Lemonade, Chocolate Bunny, and Little Bunny Fufu. A portion of the proceeds benefited Vitamin Angels.

In April, Jones Soda ran a contest called the 10,000th label contest. Where fans would vote for their favorite photo of the Top 20 that Jones Soda picked. The winner would have the honor of their photo being on a special edition bottle. With over 5,000 votes cast, this is Jones Soda's most popular contest so far.

In October Jones released, through Target, four 8 oz. Halloween soda cans came in four-packs. The flavors were paired with Classic movie monsters for each flavor. Lemon Drop Dead was the Mummy, Spooookiwi was Frankenstein's monster, Candy Corn was the Wolf-man, and Buried Pomegranate was Count Dracula. Jones also came out with three 12 oz. glass bottle of Halloween soda consisting of Dread Apple, Blood Orange, and Monster Mojito.

Also in October, the company laid off 42 of its 110 employees, partly the result of the company's expansion into the canned-soda market where it competed directly against Coca-Cola and Pepsi.

In November Jones released exclusively at Target stores three 12oz glass bottle Holiday sodas including Candy Cane, Pear Tree, Mele Kalikimaka (a pineapple and coconut combo), or "Merry Christmas" in Hawaiian. Jones also exclusively released on their website a six-pack of Green Apple, Red Apple, and Cream Soda as a Holiday color combo. Another net exclusive was the Apple Pie, Cherry Pie, and Blueberry Pie six-pack not so different from last year's dessert pack.

In December Jones released their Hanukkah Pack was a four-bottle set of Latke, Applesauce, Chocolate Coins, and Jelly Doughnut sodas, and included "1 completely functional dreidel;".

2009
To commemorate Barack Obama's inauguration, Jones released a new 'Orange You Glad For Change' orange cola flavor, available from their website.

In February, Love Potion No. 6 was also made available from the official Jones website.

In June, Internet radio station Punk Radio Cast teamed up with Jones Soda to create a punk-pop 6 pack featuring labels designed by PunkRadioCast and five punk artists – New Found Glory, Less Than Jake, Bad Brains, Thursday, and The Gaslight Anthem. The 6-pack includes:
 Less Than Jake – Root Beer
 The Gaslight Anthem – Cream Soda
 New Found Glory – Fufu Berry
 Bad Brains – Rootz Beer
 Thursday – Cream Soda
 Punk Radio Cast – Strawberry Lime

When Magic: The Gathering released a new core card set in July, Jones Soda coordinated to produce five limited edition bottles featuring Magic's five colors of mana and artwork from Magic's new Planeswalkers. The five sodas are titled Elixir of Purity (Cream Soda), Necromancer's Tonic (Root Beer), Beast Brew (Green Apple), Illusion Infusion (Blue Bubblegum), and Purifying Firewater (Fruit Punch).

An exclusive set of bottles based on Dungeons & Dragons, called 'Spellcasting Soda' was made available through the official Jones website. Sodas were titled Illithid Brain Juice, Sneak Attack, Potion of Healing, Dwarven Draught, Bigby's Crushing Thirst Destroyer, and Eldritch Blast.

Halloween brought a return of several promotional flavors, exclusively at Target. Four-bottle packs of Monster Mojito, Dread Apple, and Blood Orange made a return. Four-can packs of Buried Pomegranate, Strawberry Slime, Lemon Drop Dead, Spookiwi, and Candy Corn were also re-released.

For Thanksgiving, the company introduced a new Tofurky and Gravy flavored soda that's intended for vegetarians as an alternative option to turkey. A portion of proceeds were donated to the Progressive Animal Welfare Society (PAWS). The drink was also featured on an episode of The Tonight Show with Conan O'Brien in a segment where band member Richie "LaBamba" Rosenberg (after Andy Richter refused to drink it) tried and disliked it.

2013

In 2013, Jones Soda created a poutine-flavored limited-edition soft drink, which got international popular culture attention.

In addition, the Halloween flavors were brought back for the fall season. The flavors this year included Return of Candy Corn, Terror of Blood Orange, Dawn of Caramel Apple, and Night of Red Licorice.

2014

To coincide with the back-to-school season, Jones Soda announced a limited-edition Peanut Butter and Jelly flavor.

Blood Orange and Caramel Apple returned for the Halloween season with similar packaging to 2013's designs, but Red Licorice and Candy Corn were absent from the 2014 limited edition lineup of flavors.

2015

Peanut Butter and Jelly returned once again for the back-to-school season, while Blood Orange and Lemon Drop Dead were back for Halloween. A Thanksgiving favorite, Pumpkin Pie, also returned in 2015.

2015 also saw Jones Soda teaming up with video game publisher Bethesda to make a signature soft drink from one of Bethesda's games slated for release in November. Nuka-Cola Quantum from the Fallout series went on sale on November 10 at participating Target locations in North America alongside the release of Bethesda's game Fallout 4.

2016
Christmas themed soda returned in 2016 with Candy Cane, Sugar Plum, Pear Tree, and Gingerbread flavors.

Labels
 Jones Soda continually changes the photographs on its Soda and Naturals labels. The photos are generally black and white. Its website features a database of over one million submitted pictures, as well as an archived collection of internal company notes, detailing which pictures appeared when, on what flavors (for collectors of the images). Customers can also submit fortunes (similar to a fortune cookie) to be printed underneath the bottle cap.

The website sometimes asks for specific themes for photo uploads like the Patriot Photos or the Landmark Contest in order to create a special collection of labels. Recently, they have created a Signature series that includes photos and written signatures of Jones Soda Pro Athletes.

myJones
In 1999, Jones began selling Jones through a new section of their website in order to meet the growing demand of people wanting to circumvent the photo selection process. myJones is a customizable 12-pack of bottles with which anyone can have their picture and message. The creation process involves uploading a picture (with optional photo credit of up to 50 characters) and providing customization (up to 7 lines of 50 characters). The fortunes under the caps are not customizable.

Above the picture on the label, the word "my" is added before "Jones Soda Co." to indicate it was customized and not bought at retail.

Marketing
Rather than television commercials or magazine ads, Jones chooses to focus on product placement. Athletes such as Benji Weatherley, Matt Hoffman, and Bam Margera, known as Jones Pro Riders, promote Jones by appearing with the logo (or often the actual product) at various events or on television appearances. Another group of athletes, the Jones Emerging Athletes, also support Jones.

Jones also employs two Jones Soda RVs which travel the West and East coasts of North America "handing out soda and talking to the people on the street".

On May 23, 2007, the Seattle Seahawks chose Jones Soda as its official soft drink, and its products were sold at Qwest Field from the 2007 through the 2009 season.  During the football season, Jones Soda also produced bottles labeled with photos of Seahawks players for sale both at football games and in supermarkets. The Seahawks previously sold soft drinks from The Coca-Cola Company; the Jones Soda deal made the team the first in the NFL to sign an exclusive deal with a soft drink company other than Coca-Cola or Pepsi. In June 2010, the Seahawks severed their association with Jones Soda and announced that they had signed a five-year agreement with Coca-Cola.

On February 12, 2008, Alaska Airlines and Horizon Air announced they would serve Jones Soda on their flights. This arrangement ended March 1, 2010, when Alaska and Horizon switched to serving Coca-Cola products. The airlines cited customer demand as the reason.

The 2009 February/March issue of the fine beverage publication,  Mutineer Magazine, featured Jones Soda on the cover as well as an in-depth article about the company inside the magazine.

The company's motto, "Run with the little guy… create some change." appears on most Jones products.

Dr. Dre's character in the 2001 film the Wash is seen drinking a Jones Soda.

Tahj Mowry's and Aleisha Allen's characters in the 2007 film Are We Done Yet?'' are seen drinking Jones Sodas.

See also
 Rocket Fizz – a company that produces unique flavors of soft drinks

References

External links

 Jones Soda Co. home page
 Jones Soda reviews at BevNET.com
Mutineer Magazine Issue #4

American soft drinks
Drink companies of the United States
Food and drink companies based in Seattle
Companies formerly listed on the Nasdaq
Food and drink companies established in 1995
1995 establishments in British Columbia
Food and drink companies based in Washington (state)